Kirill Gusev (born 6 April 1999) is a Belarusian professional footballer who plays for Dnepr Mogilev.

References

External links 
 
 

1999 births
Living people
People from Mogilev
Sportspeople from Mogilev Region
Belarusian footballers
Association football forwards
FC Dnepr Mogilev players
FC Dnyapro Mogilev players
FC Slonim-2017 players